The Coddling of the American Mind: How Good Intentions and Bad Ideas Are Setting Up a Generation for Failure is a 2018 book by Greg Lukianoff and Jonathan Haidt. It is an expansion of a popular essay the two wrote for The Atlantic in 2015. Lukianoff and Haidt argue that overprotection is having a negative effect on university students and that the use of trigger warnings and safe spaces does more harm than good.

Overview
Lukianoff and Haidt argue that many problems on campus have their origins in three "great untruths" that have become prominent in education: "What doesn’t kill you makes you weaker"; "always trust your feelings"; and "life is a battle between good people and evil people". The authors state that these three "great untruths" contradict modern psychology and ancient wisdom from many cultures.  

The book goes on to discuss microaggressions, identity politics, "safetyism", call-out culture, and intersectionality. The authors define safetyism as a culture or belief system in which safety (which includes "emotional safety") has become a sacred value, which means that people become unwilling to make trade-offs demanded by other practical and moral concerns. They argue that embracing the culture of safetyism has interfered with young people’s social, emotional, and intellectual development. Continuing on to discuss contemporary partisanship or the "rising political polarization and cross party animosity", they state that the left and right are "locked into a game of mutual provocation and reciprocal outrage".

The authors call on university and college administrators to identify with freedom of inquiry by endorsing the Chicago principles on free speech, through which university and colleges notify students in advance that they do not support the use of trigger warnings or safe spaces. They suggest specific programs, such as LetGrow, Lenore Skenazy's Free Range Kids, teaching children mindfulness, and the basics of cognitive behavioral therapy (CBT). They encourage a charitable approach to the interpretations of other peoples' statements instead of assuming they meant offense. 

In their conclusion, the authors write that there will be positive changes in the near future as small groups of universities "develop a different sort of academic culture—one that finds ways to make students from all identity groups feel welcome without using the divisive methods." They say that "market forces will take care of the rest" as "applications and  enrollment" surge at these schools.

Release
The book reached number eight on The New York Times hardcover nonfiction best-sellers list. It spent four weeks on the list.

Reception
Edward Luce of the Financial Times praised the book, saying the authors "do a great job of showing how 'safetyism' is cramping young minds." Conor Friedersdorf, writing in The Atlantic, gave the book a positive review. Writing for The New York Times, Thomas Chatterton Williams praised the book's explanations and analysis of recent college campus trends as "compelling".

Writing for The Washington Post, Michael S. Roth, president of Wesleyan University, gave the book a mixed review, questioning the book's assertion that students today are "disempowered because they’ve been convinced they are fragile." Roth said that the authors' "insights on the dangers of creating habits of 'moral dependency' are timely and important." Moira Weigel, writing for The Guardian, criticized Lukianoff and Haidt for insisting that "the crises moving young people to action are all in their heads." The authors say that the students suffer from pathological cognitive distortions that fuel their activism and can be corrected by using self-help methods the authors provide based on CBT. She says that the authors have created their own speech codes, which includes the cant of progress.

See also
 The Closing of the American Mind
 iGen
 Heterodox Academy

References

External links

The September 2015 original essay in The Atlantic upon which the book is based.
Additional afterword, 2021
Summary & Analysis of The Coddling of the American Mind

2018 non-fiction books
Works by Jonathan Haidt
English-language books
Moral psychology books
Penguin Books books
Books about higher education
Books about social psychology